Josh Woodman (born March 21, 1992) is a professional Canadian football defensive back who is currently a member of the Edmonton Elks. He most recently played for the BC Lions of the Canadian Football League (CFL). He was drafted by the Edmonton Eskimos 44th overall in the fifth round of the 2016 CFL Draft. He played CIS football for the Western Mustangs.

References

External links
Edmonton Eskimos bio

1992 births
Canadian football defensive backs
Edmonton Elks players
Living people
Players of Canadian football from Ontario
Western Mustangs football players
Sportspeople from Chatham-Kent
BC Lions players